This is a list of electricity-generating power stations in the U.S. state of Virginia. In 2019, Virginia had a total summer capacity of 28,045 MW (the total capacity of all stations given below is 24,986 MW ) through all of its power plants, and a net generation of 96,828 GWh. The corresponding electrical energy generation mix in 2021 was 56.6% natural gas, 29.9% nuclear, 3.8% solar, 3.6% biomass, 3.3% coal, 1.9% hydroelectric, 0.6% other, and 0.3% petroleum.

The Virginia Clean Economy Act of 2020 directs the construction of 16,100 MW of solar power and onshore wind and up to 5,200 MW of offshore wind by 2035, bringing the state's utility-delivered power to 100% renewable energy by 2045. It will close all but two coal-fired plants by 2024, with the Virginia City and Clover plants allowed to operate until 2045, though economic conditions may close them earlier.

Power stations

See also

List of power stations in the United States

References

 
Lists of buildings and structures in Virginia
Geographic coordinate lists
Virginia